Victoria J. Orphan is a geobiologist at the California Institute of Technology who studies the interactions between marine microorganisms and their environment. As of 2020, she is the Chair for the Center of Environmental Microbial Interactions.

Education 
Victoria Orphan received her B.A. in Aquatic Biology (1994) and Ph.D. in Ecology, Evolution and Marine Biology (2001) from the University of California, Santa Barbara. She served as a National Research Council fellow at the NASA Ames Research Center (2002–2004) before joining the Geobiology faculty at California Institute of Technology.

Career 
Orphan is the James Irvine Professor of Environmental Science and Geobiology at the California Institute of Technology. She has also been an adjunct scientist at Monterey Bay Aquarium Research Institute (MBARI) since 2009 and Senior Scientist of the Center for Dark Energy Biosphere Investigations, a Science and Technology Center funded by the National Science Foundation and headquartered at the University of Southern California. As of 2020, she is the Alan V.C. Davis and Lenabelle Davis Leadership Chair for the Center of Environmental Microbial Interactions.

Research 
Orphan's research integrates molecular, microscopy, and geochemical techniques to improve understanding of various processes, including those that serve as the primary sink for the greenhouse gas methane in the ocean.  She focuses on microbially-mediated anaerobic oxidation of methane (AOM) in deep sea sediment. Specifically, she looks at the relationships between two groups of marine microbes: archaea and bacteria. Orphan uses tools such as nanoSIMS to visualize these organisms at the microscale and track how and when they exchange energy. Through her research, Orphan has helped develop novel stable isotope applications that provide insight into the relationship between microbes and large-scale geochemical processes.

Popularization of science 
Victoria Orphan appeared in the 2018 Netflix documentary The Most Unknown on scientific research directed by Ian Cheney.

Personal life 
Orphan is in a relationship with fellow scientist Shana K. Goffredi.

Honors and awards
 2001, National Research Council Fellowship, NASA Ames Research Center
2005, Gordon and Betty Moore Foundation Young Investigator Award
 2010, DOE Early Career Research Award
 2013, Gordon and Betty Moore Foundation Investigator Award
 2016, MacArthur Fellowship
 2018, NOMIS Distinguished Scientist Award
 2020, species (Peinaleopolynoe orphanae) named after her
2020, American Academy of Arts and Science member
2021, elected Fellow of the American Geophysical Union

References

External links
Orphan Lab (California Institute of Technology) page
MacArthur Foundation page
Gordon and Betty Moore Foundation page

Year of birth missing (living people)
Living people
Geobiologists
California Institute of Technology faculty
American women scientists
MacArthur Fellows
American LGBT scientists
University of California, Santa Barbara alumni
American women academics
21st-century American women